Donato Disabato (born 17 April 1990) is an Italian footballer who plays as a midfielder for the swiss club Paradiso.

Club career
Born in Varese, Disabato started his career at hometown club Varese. In summer 2008, he signed a youth contract with Serie B side AlbinoLeffe. He wore no.90 shirt and made his Serie B debut on the opening match of 2009–10 Serie B season, which along with Michael Cia, they substituted Marco Cellini and Enrico Geroni respectively in the 75th minute. A minute later AlbinoLeffe's opponent Vicenza scored the equalizing goal and eventually ended in 2–2 draw.  He also started the last match of the season, which he was substituted by Tommaso Morosini at the 2nd half, which AlbinoLeffe already lost to Reggina 1–3 and ended the match with the same score.

On 10 August 2010, he was loaned to Lega Pro 2nd Division side Pro Vercelli along with Mattia Corradi. The temporary deal was renewed in 2011–12 Lega Pro Prima Divisione season. After the Piedmontese club promoted to 2012–13 Serie B (co-currently with the relegation and involvement in the betting scandal for AlbinoLeffe), Pro Vercelli signed Disabato in co-ownership deal in August 2012, but arranged another loan deal for Disabato to Prato. In June 2013 the co-ownership was renewed. In June 2014 he was acquired by Pro Vercelli outright.

On 24 November 2009 he played a training match for Italy under-21 Serie B representative team. The U21 Serie B split into blue and white team, which Disabato played as blue team member and substituted Nicola Rigoni in the 60th minute. Blue team lost 0–2 to white team.

On 19 July 2014 he was signed by Carrarese.

On 7 August 2019, he joined Serie D club Savona.

On 30 July 2020, Disabato joined Serie D club Città di Varese.

References

External links
 Football.it Profile 
 

1990 births
Sportspeople from Varese
Living people
Italian footballers
Association football midfielders
S.S.D. Varese Calcio players
U.C. AlbinoLeffe players
F.C. Pro Vercelli 1892 players
A.C. Prato players
Carrarese Calcio players
Aurora Pro Patria 1919 players
Savona F.B.C. players
A.S.D. Città di Varese players
Serie B players
Serie C players
Serie D players
Footballers from Lombardy